The history of Anglo-Saxon London relates to the history of the city of London during the Anglo-Saxon period, in the 7th to 11th centuries.

Romano-British Londinium had been abandoned in the late 5th century, although the London Wall remained intact. There was an Anglo-Saxon settlement by the early 7th century, called Lundenwic, about one mile west of Londinium, to the north of the present Strand. Lundenwic came under direct Mercian control in about 670. After the death of Offa of Mercia in 796, it was disputed between Mercia and Wessex.

Viking invasions became frequent from the 830s, and a Viking army is believed to have camped in the old Roman walls during the winter of 871. Alfred the Great reestablished English control of London in 886, and renewed its fortifications. The old Roman walls were repaired and the defensive ditch was recut, and the old Roman city became the main site of population.  The city now became known as Lundenburg, marking the beginning of the history of the City of London. Sweyn Forkbeard attacked London unsuccessfully in 996 and 1013, but his son Cnut the Great finally gained control of London, and all of England, in 1016.

Edward the Confessor, the stepson of Cnut, became king in 1042. He built Westminster Abbey, the first large Romanesque church in England, consecrated in 1065, and the first Palace of Westminster. These were located just up-river from the city. Edward's death led to a succession crisis, and ultimately the Norman invasion of England.

Lundenwic

The Roman city was abandoned in the early Anglo-Saxon period, and there is almost no reliable evidence about what happened in the London area from around 450 to 600. Early Anglo-Saxon settlement in the London area was not on the site of the abandoned Roman city, although the Roman London Wall remained intact. Instead, by the 670s the port town of Lundenwic was developing in the area of Covent Garden.

In the early 8th century, Lundenwic was described by the Venerable Bede as "a trading centre for many nations who visit it by land and sea". The Old English term wic or "trading town" ultimately derived from the Latin word vicus, so Lundenwic meant "London trading town".

Archaeologists were for many years puzzled as to where early Anglo-Saxon London was located, as they could find little evidence of occupation within the Roman city walls from this period. However, in the 1980s, London was rediscovered, after extensive independent excavations by archaeologists Alan Vince and Martin Biddle were reinterpreted as being of an urban character. In the Covent Garden area, excavations in 1985 and 2005 have uncovered an extensive Anglo-Saxon settlement that dates back to the 7th century. "the beach") from the present-day National Gallery site in the west to Aldwych in the east.

By about 600, Anglo-Saxon England had become divided into a number of small kingdoms within what eventually became known as the Heptarchy. From the mid-6th century, London was incorporated into the Kingdom of Essex, which extended as far west as St Albans and for a period included Middlesex and Surrey.

In 604, Sæberht of Essex was converted to Christianity and London received Mellitus, its first post-Roman Bishop of London. At this time Essex owed allegiance to Æthelberht of Kent and it was under Æthelberht that Mellitus founded the first cathedral of the East Saxons, which is traditionally said to be on the site of an old Roman temple of Diana (although the 17th century architect Christopher Wren found no evidence of this). The original building would have been only a modest church at first and it may well have been destroyed after Mellitus was expelled from the city by Sæberht's pagan successors in 616. The bishopric of London was re-established for good in 675, when the Archbishop of Canterbury, Theodore of Tarsus, installed Earconwald as bishop.

Lundenwic came under direct Mercian control in about 670, as Essex became gradually reduced in size and status. After the death of Offa of Mercia in 796, it was disputed between Mercia and Wessex.

Viking attacks

London suffered attacks from Vikings, which became increasingly common from around 830 onwards. It was attacked in 842 in a raid that was described by a chronicler as "the great slaughter". In 851, another raiding party, reputedly involving 350 ships, came to plunder the city.

In 865, the Viking Great Heathen Army launched a large scale invasion of the small kingdom of East Anglia. They overran East Anglia, Mercia and Northumbria and came close to controlling most of Anglo-Saxon England. By 871 they had reached London and they are believed to have camped within the old Roman walls during the winter of that year. Although it is unclear what happened during this time, London may have come under Viking control for a period.

In 878, West Saxon forces led by Alfred the Great defeated the Vikings at the Battle of Ethandun and forced their leader Guthrum to sue for peace. The Treaty of Wedmore and the later Treaty of Alfred and Guthrum divided England and created the Danish-controlled Danelaw.

Lundenburg

English rule in London was restored by 886. Alfred quickly set about establishing fortified towns or burhs across southern England to improve his kingdom's defences: London was no exception. Within ten years, the settlement within the old Roman walls was re-established, now known as Lundenburg. The old Roman walls were repaired and the defensive ditch was re-cut. These changes effectively marked the beginning of the present City of London, the boundaries of which are still to some extent defined by its ancient city walls.

As the focus of Lundenburg was moved back to within the Roman walls, the original Lundenwic was largely abandoned and in time gained the name of Ealdwic, 'old settlement', a name which survives today as Aldwych.

10th century London

Alfred appointed his son-in-law Earl Æthelred of Mercia, the heir to the destroyed kingdom of Mercia, as Governor of London and established two defended Boroughs to defend the bridge, which was probably rebuilt at this time. The southern end of the bridge was established as the Southwark or Suthringa Geworc ('defensive work of the men of Surrey'). From this point, the city of London began to develop its own unique local government.

After Æthelred's death, London came under the direct control of English kings. Alfred's son Edward the Elder won back much land from Danish control. By the early 10th century, London had become an important commercial centre. Although the political centre of England was Winchester, London was becoming increasingly important. Æthelstan held many royal councils in London and issued laws from there. Æthelred the Unready favoured London as his capital and issued his Laws of London from there in 978.

The Vikings' return

It was during the reign of Æthelred that Vikings resumed their raids, led by Sweyn Forkbeard of Denmark. London was attacked unsuccessfully in 994, but numerous raids followed. In 1013, London underwent a long siege and Æthelred was forced to flee abroad.

Æthelred returned with his ally the Norwegian king Olaf and reclaimed London. A Norse saga tells of a battle during the Viking occupation where the English king Æthelred returned to attack Viking-occupied London. According to the saga, the Danes lined London Bridge and showered the attackers with spears.

Undaunted, the attackers pulled the roofs off nearby houses and held them over their heads in the boats. Thus protected, they were able to get close enough to the bridge to attach ropes to the piers and pull the bridge down, defeat the Vikings and ending the occupation of London. There is some speculation that the nursery rhyme "London Bridge is Falling Down" stems from this incident. Following Æthelred's death on 23 April 1016, his son Edmund Ironside was declared king.

Sweyn's son Cnut the Great continued the attacks, harrying Warwickshire and pushing northwards across eastern Mercia in early 1016. Edmund remained in London, still unsubdued behind its famous walls, and was elected king after the death of Aethelred, but Cnut returned southward and the Danish army evidently divided, some dealing with Edmund, some besieging London.

A battle at Penselwood, in Somerset and a subsequent battle at Sherston, in Wiltshire, fought over two days left neither side victorious. Edmund was able to temporarily relieve London, driving the enemy away and defeating them after crossing the Thames at Brentford. Suffering heavy losses, he withdrew to Wessex to gather fresh troops, and the Danes again brought London under siege, but after another unsuccessful assault they withdrew into Kent under attack by the English, with a battle fought at Otford.

On 18 October 1016, the Danes were engaged by Edmund's army as they retired towards their ships, leading to the Battle of Assandun. In the ensuing struggle, Eadric Streona, whose return to the English side had perhaps only been a ruse, withdrew his forces from the fray, bringing about a decisive English defeat. Edmund fled westwards, and Cnut pursued him into Gloucestershire, with another battle probably fought near the Forest of Dean.

On an island near Deerhurst, Cnut and Edmund – who had been wounded – met to negotiate terms of peace. It was agreed that all of England north of the Thames was to be the domain of the Danish prince, while all to the south was kept by the English king, along with London. Accession to the reign of the entire realm was set to pass to Cnut upon Edmund's death.

Edmund died on 30 November, within weeks of the agreement. Some sources claim Edmund was murdered, although the circumstances of his death are unknown. In accord with the treaty, Cnut was left as king of all of England. His coronation was in London, at Christmas, with recognition by the nobility in January the next year at Oxford.

Cnut was succeeded briefly by his sons, Harold Harefoot and Harthacnut, after which the Saxon line was restored when Cnut's stepson Edward the Confessor became king in 1042.

Edward the Confessor and the Norman invasion
Following Harthacnut's death on 8 June 1042, Godwin, the most powerful of the English earls, supported Edward, who succeeded to the throne. The Anglo-Saxon Chronicle describes the popularity he enjoyed at his accession — "before he [Harthacnut] was buried, all the people chose Edward as king in London." Edward was crowned at the cathedral of Winchester, the royal seat of the West Saxons, on 3 April 1043.

Modern historians reject the traditional view that Edward mainly employed Norman favourites, but he did have foreigners in his household. Chief among them was Robert of Jumièges, who came to England in 1041, becoming Bishop of London in 1043. According to the Vita Ædwardi Regis, he became "always the most powerful confidential adviser to the king".

When Edward appointed Robert of Jumièges as Archbishop of Canterbury in 1051, he chose the leading craftsman Spearhafoc to replace Robert as bishop of London, but he was never consecrated.

Edward's Norman sympathies are most clearly seen in the major building project of his reign, Westminster Abbey, the first Norman Romanesque church in England. This was commenced between 1042 and 1052 as a royal burial church, consecrated on 28 December 1065, completed after his death in about 1090, and demolished in 1245 to make way for Henry III's new building, which still stands. Edward's building is shown in the Bayeux Tapestry, and was very similar to Jumièges Abbey in Normandy, which was built at the same time. Robert of Jumièges must have been closely involved in both buildings, although it is not clear which is the original and which the copy.

Following Edward's death in 1066, no clear heir was apparent and his cousin, Duke William of Normandy, claimed the throne. The English Witenagemot met in the city and elected Edward's brother-in-law, Harold Godwinson, as king: Harold was crowned in Westminster Abbey. William, outraged by this, then invaded England.

Notes

References

 Billings, Malcolm (1994), London: a companion to its history and archaeology, 
Inwood, Stephen. A History of London (1998)

External links
Reassessing what we collect website – Anglo-Saxon London History of Anglo-Saxon London with objects and images

History of London by period
Anglo-Saxon settlements